Spicata, a Latin word meaning spiked, may refer to:

 Spicata (genus), a flea genus in the subfamily Dactylopsyllinae

Species

 Actaea spicata, a poisonous herbaceous perennial
 Hexalectris spicata, an orchid species

See also
 Spicatum